Elachista tuberella is a moth in the family Elachistidae. It was described by Sruoga in 2008. It is found in Nepal. The habitat consists of mixed secondary scrub and pine forests.

References

Moths described in 2008
tuberella
Moths of Asia